Nógrádsáp is a village in Nógrád County, Hungary with 826 inhabitants (2014).

References

Populated places in Nógrád County